Abacetus ifani is a species of ground beetle in the subfamily Pterostichinae. It was described by Straneo in 1971.

References

ifani
Beetles described in 1971